M. Aminul Islam is a former Bangladeshi career diplomat.

References 

Living people
Bangladeshi diplomats
High Commissioners of Bangladesh to Canada
Ambassadors of Bangladesh to Bhutan
Year of birth missing (living people)
University of Dhaka alumni